Spargapeithes () was the name of a king of the Scythic tribe of the Agathyrsoi.

Name

Reign
According to the Greek historian Herodotus,  treacherously killed the Scythian king .

References

Sources

See also
List of rulers of Thrace and Dacia

Thracian kings
Scythian rulers